Call to action or variant thereof, may refer 

 Call to Action, a US group advocating change in the doctrine of the Catholic Church
 Call to action (marketing), a key element of many styles of persuasion, also used on the Web
 Call to action (political), a call to activists to participate in a direct action or similar political activity
 "Call to Action" (Supergirl), an episode of Supergirl
 A Call to Action: Women, Religion, Violence, and Power (2014 book), book by Jimmy Carter
 Global Leadership Awards — 2005: "A Call to Action", the 2005 edition of the Global Leadership Awards - "A Call to Action"
 Knight Commission — Second report: A Call to Action, 2001 report issued on college athletics in the U.S.A.
 Stan Bush: Call to Action, record from the 1997 Transformers soundtrack album "Till All Are One"

See also
 Call For Action, the name of several consumer helplines
 Call For Action, consumer protection (United States)